The Diamond Collection is the first greatest hits album by Serbian pop singer Jelena Karleuša released on 15 July 2009 under City Records.

Track listing

Release history

References

2009 compilation albums
Serbian-language compilation albums
City Records albums
Jelena Karleuša albums